Vexin-sur-Epte (literally Vexin on Epte) is a commune in the department of Eure, northern France. The municipality was established on 1 January 2016 by merger of the former communes of Écos (the seat), Berthenonville, Bus-Saint-Rémy, Cahaignes, Cantiers, Civières, Dampsmesnil, Fontenay-en-Vexin, Forêt-la-Folie, Fourges, Fours-en-Vexin, Guitry, Panilleuse and Tourny.

Population

See also 
Communes of the Eure department

References 

Communes of Eure
Populated places established in 2016
2016 establishments in France